Supervivientes: Expedición Robinson 2001, was the second season of the show Supervivientes to air in Spain and it was broadcast on Telecinco from September 16, 2001 to December 20, 2001. This season took place on the island of Madagascar off the coast of Africa. For this season the contestants were again initially divided into the North and South teams. In episode five a tribal swap occurred in which Alfredo "Freddy" Cortina and José "Kaky" Lópe swapped tribes. As part of this twist neither could be voted out before the merge. When the tribes merged, for the first few days following the merge there weren't any reward challenges, and following the acceptance of food from a native in episode 8, it was decided that none of the contestants would be immune at the eighth tribal council. When it came time for the final three, the contestants took part in two challenges in order to determine who would be the finalists. Ultimately, it was Alfredo "Freddy" Cortina who won this season over Antonio "Amate" Amate by 6 jury votes and took home the grand prize of 20,000,000 pesetas.
Andrés was voted as the favourite contestants from this season with 37% of public votes and he won the prize of 3,000,000 pesetas.

Finishing order

Voting history

 As Freddy and Kaky had swapped tribes in episode five, both were immune at the fifth tribal council if their new tribe lost the immunity challenge.

 Adriana could cast a black vote at the seventh tribal council.

 Francesca could cast a black vote at the twelfth tribal council.

External links
https://web.archive.org/web/20011213224639/http://www.supervivientes.telecinco.es/su_concursantes.htm
http://www.oocities.org/topsupervivientes/diariorobinson.htm

Survivor Spain seasons